Silvennoinen is a Finnish surname. Notable people with the surname include:

Emmi Silvennoinen (born 1988), Finnish keyboard player
Heikki Silvennoinen (born 1954), Finnish musician and actor
Hemmo Silvennoinen (1932-2002), Finnish ski jumper
Kaija Silvennoinen (born 1954), Finnish ski orienteering competitor
Lauri Silvennoinen (1916-2004), Finnish cross-country skier 
Leena Silvennoinen (born 1958), Finnish orienteering competitor
Mikko Silvennoinen, Finnish television host, journalist and producer

Finnish-language surnames